Gerald "Gerry" Esplana is a former Filipino basketball player, politician and coach. He was nicknamed "Mr. Cool" and "The Plan" while playing professionally.

He played for Presto Tivoli (when he won PBA Rookie of the Year), Sta. Lucia Realtors, and Shell Turbo Chargers (when he won two championships and a Finals MVP trophy).

He formerly coached the EAC Generals in the NCAA and the Valenzuela Classics in the MPBL. He also assisted Boy Sablan on the UST Growling Tigers.

He served as former councilor in Valenzuela from 2004 to 2013.

Coaching record

Collegiate record

Personal life 
Esplana married Jennifer Pingree, 1990 Binibining Pilipinas Ms. International titleholder.

The couple has one daughter and two sons Alyssa, Josiah and Jairus.

References

External links 

Living people
1966 births
FEU Tamaraws basketball players
Filipino basketball players
21st-century Filipino politicians
EAC Generals basketball coaches
UST Growling Tigers basketball coaches
Metro Manila city and municipal councilors
People from Valenzuela, Metro Manila